Shomanay (Karakalpak: Шоманай, Shomanay) is a city and seat of the Shomanay district in Karakalpakstan in Uzbekistan. Its population was 10,513 in 1989, and 14,000 in 2016.

References

Populated places in Karakalpakstan
Cities in Uzbekistan